"I Like the Way (The Kissing Game)" is a song recorded by American R&B group Hi-Five for their 1990 eponymous debut studio album. The song was written by Teddy Riley, Bernard Belle and Dave Way, and released as the album's second single on January 2, 1991, by the Jive label. It was a number-one pop song and was certified Gold by the Recording Industry Association of America (RIAA) on May 10, 1991. The video has an exceptionally large amount of dark colours and shadows in contrast to the light-hearted and bubblegum pop song that plays.

Chart performance
In the United States, "I Like the Way" spent two weeks at number one on the Hot R&B/Hip-Hop Songs chart; and one week at number one on the Billboard Hot 100 chart.

Credits and personnel
 Written by Teddy Riley, Bernard Belle & Dave Way
 Produced and mixed by Teddy Riley
 Co-produced by Bernard Belle 
 Engineered by David Way
 1. Remixed by Ralph Rolle & Tom Vercillo at Battery Studios
 3 & 4. Remixed by Gerard Harmon, Armando Colon, & Ralph Rolle at Battery Studios for Phat Kat Productions
 Guitar: Patricia Halligan
 Drums: Ralph Rolle
 Keyboards: Armando Colon
 Little Girl's Voice: India

Charts

Weekly charts

Year-end charts

All-time charts

See also
List of Billboard Hot 100 number-one singles of the 1990s
List of number-one R&B singles of 1991 (U.S.)

References

External links
 

Songs about kissing
1990 songs
1991 singles
Billboard Hot 100 number-one singles
Hi-Five songs
Jive Records singles
New jack swing songs
Song recordings produced by Teddy Riley
Songs written by Teddy Riley
Songs written by Bernard Belle